Mehis Heinsaar (born 1 August 1973) is an Estonian writer. He has mainly written short stories. His stories represents the style of magical realism.

He has won many awards, for example, the Friedebert Tuglas Short Story Award three times (2000, 2002, 2010).

Works
 2001: short story collection "Vanameeste näppaja" ('The Snatcher of Old Men') 
 2001: short story collection "Härra Pauli kroonikad" ('The Chronicles of Mr. Paul')
 2007: short story collection "Rändaja õnn" ('The Traveller's Happiness')

References

1973 births
Living people
Estonian male short story writers
Estonian male poets
21st-century Estonian writers
21st-century Estonian poets
University of Tartu alumni
Writers from Tallinn